Patrick Groetzki (born 4 July 1989) is a German handballer for Rhein-Neckar Löwen and the German national team.

He made his debut on 17 June 2009 against Belarus.

Achievements
Summer Olympics:
: 2016
Junior World Championship:
Winner: 2009

References

External links

Profile at Rhein-Neckar Löwen official website

1989 births
Living people
Sportspeople from Pforzheim
German male handball players
Handball-Bundesliga players
Rhein-Neckar Löwen players
Olympic handball players of Germany
Handball players at the 2016 Summer Olympics
Medalists at the 2016 Summer Olympics
Olympic bronze medalists for Germany
Olympic medalists in handball
21st-century German people